Zhou Yan (born 28 May 1979 in Dalian, Liaoning) is a female Chinese softball player who competed in the 2000 Summer Olympics.

In the 2000 Olympic softball competition she finished fourth with the Chinese team. She played two matches.

External links
profile 

1979 births
Living people
Chinese softball players
Olympic softball players of China
Sportspeople from Dalian
Softball players at the 2000 Summer Olympics